Der stille Ozean is a 1983 Austrian drama film directed by Xaver Schwarzenberger. It was entered into the 33rd Berlin International Film Festival, where it won the Silver Bear for an outstanding single achievement.

Cast
 Hanno Pöschl as Dr. Ascher
 Marie-France Pisier as Florence
 Johannes Thanheiser as Rogy
 Bruno Dallansky as Hofmeister
 Marius Cella as Lüscher
 Bert Breit as Zeiner
 Maria Emo as Witwe Egger
 Paola Loew as 1. Schwester
 Maria Martina as 2. Schwester
 Gerlinde Ully as Regina
 Liliana Nelska as Frau Melzer
 Emanuel Schmied as Gendarm Hofmeister
 Herbert Steinmetz as Arzt

References

External links

1983 films
1983 drama films
Austrian drama films
1980s German-language films
Films directed by Xaver Schwarzenberger
Austrian black-and-white films
Films based on Austrian novels